Lembit Sibul (January 14, 1947 — October 2, 2001) was an Estonian humorist and stage actor, known for his work with the Estonian satire and humor magazine, Pikker.

In 1997 Lembit Sibul was awarded the Estonian humor award Meie Mats.

References

1947 births
2001 deaths
Estonian male stage actors
Estonian journalists
Estonian humorists
Recipients of Meie Mats
Burials at Rahumäe Cemetery
20th-century Estonian male actors
20th-century journalists